

Legislative Assembly elections

Arunachal Pradesh

Bihar

Source:

Gujarat

Himachal Pradesh

Madhya Pradesh

Source:

Maharashtra

Manipur

Odisha

Rajasthan

References

External links

 Election Commission of India

1990 elections in India
India
1990 in India
Elections in India by year